In geometry, an alternation or partial truncation, is an operation on a polygon, polyhedron, tiling, or higher dimensional polytope that removes alternate vertices.

Coxeter labels an alternation by a prefixed h, standing for hemi or half. Because alternation reduces all polygon faces to half as many sides, it can only be applied to polytopes with all even-sided faces. An alternated square face becomes a digon, and being degenerate, is usually reduced to a single edge.

More generally any vertex-uniform polyhedron or tiling with a vertex configuration consisting of all even-numbered elements can be alternated. For example, the alternation of a vertex figure with 2a.2b.2c is a.3.b.3.c.3 where the three is the number of elements in this vertex figure. A special case is square faces whose order divides in half into degenerate digons. So for example, the cube 4.4.4 is alternated as 2.3.2.3.2.3 which is reduced to 3.3.3, being the tetrahedron, and all the 6 edges of the tetrahedra can also be seen as the degenerate faces of the original cube.

Snub 

A snub (in Coxeter's terminology) can be seen as an alternation of a truncated regular or truncated quasiregular polyhedron. In general a polyhedron can be snubbed if its truncation has only even-sided faces. All truncated rectified polyhedra can be snubbed, not just from regular polyhedra.

The snub square antiprism is an example of a general snub, and can be represented by ss{2,4}, with the square antiprism, s{2,4}.

Alternated polytopes 

This alternation operation applies to higher-dimensional polytopes and honeycombs as well, but in general most of the results of this operation will not be uniform. The voids created by the deleted vertices will not in general create uniform facets, and there are typically not enough degrees of freedom to allow an appropriate rescaling of the new edges. Exceptions do exist, however, such as the derivation of the snub 24-cell from the truncated 24-cell.

Examples:
 Honeycombs
 An alternated cubic honeycomb is the tetrahedral-octahedral honeycomb.
 An alternated hexagonal prismatic honeycomb is the gyrated alternated cubic honeycomb.
 4-polytope
 An alternated truncated 24-cell is the snub 24-cell.
 4-honeycombs:
 An alternated truncated 24-cell honeycomb is the snub 24-cell honeycomb.
 A hypercube can always be alternated into a uniform demihypercube.
 Cube → Tetrahedron (regular)
  → 
 Tesseract (8-cell) → 16-cell (regular)
  → 
 Penteract → demipenteract (semiregular)
 Hexeract → demihexeract (uniform)
 ...

Altered polyhedra 
Coxeter also used the operator a, which contains both halves, so retains the original symmetry. For even-sided regular polyhedra, a{2p,q} represents a compound polyhedron with two opposite copies of h{2p,q}. For odd-sided, greater than 3, regular polyhedra a{p,q}, becomes a star polyhedron.

Here all the pentagons have been alternated into pentagrams, and triangles have been inserted to take up the resulting free edges.

Here all the pentagrams have been alternated back into pentagons, and triangles have been inserted to take up the resulting free edges.

Alternate truncations 

A similar operation can truncate alternate vertices, rather than just removing them. Below is a set of polyhedra that can be generated from the Catalan solids. These have two types of vertices which can be alternately truncated. Truncating the "higher order" vertices and both vertex types produce these forms:

See also 
 Conway polyhedral notation
 Wythoff construction

References 

 Coxeter, H.S.M. Regular Polytopes, (3rd edition, 1973), Dover edition, 
 Norman Johnson Uniform Polytopes, Manuscript (1991)
 N.W. Johnson: The Theory of Uniform Polytopes and Honeycombs, Ph.D. Dissertation, University of Toronto, 1966
 
 Richard Klitzing, Snubs, alternated facetings, and Stott-Coxeter-Dynkin diagrams, Symmetry: Culture and Science, Vol. 21, No.4, 329-344, (2010)

External links 

 Polyhedra Names, snub

Polyhedra
4-polytopes